The Zerotulidae comprise a taxonomic family of sea snails, marine gastropod molluscs in the superfamily Littorinoidea.

According to the taxonomy of the Gastropoda by Bouchet & Rocroi (2005) the family Zerotulidae has no subfamilies.

Genera 
Genera within the family Zerotulidae include:
 Dickdellia Warén & Hain, 1996
 Frovina Thiele, 1912
 Pseudonatica Simone, 2018
 Trilirata Warén & Hain, 1996
 Zerotula H. J. Finlay, 1926

Genera brought into synonymy:
 Frigidilacuna Tomlin, 1930: synonym of Frovina Thiele, 1912
 Prolacuna Thiele, 1913: synonym of Frovina Thiele, 1912
 Sublacuna Thiele, 1912: synonym of Frovina Thiele, 1912

References 

 Bouchet P., Rocroi J.P., Hausdorf B., Kaim A., Kano Y., Nützel A., Parkhaev P., Schrödl M. & Strong E.E. (2017). Revised classification, nomenclator and typification of gastropod and monoplacophoran families. Malacologia. 61(1-2): 1-526.

Further reading
 Warén A. & Hain S. (1996) Description of Zerotulidae fam. nov. (Littorinoidea), with comments on an Antarctic littorinid gastropod. The Veliger 39(4):277-334

External links
 The Taxonomicon
 Simone, L. R. L. (2018). Convergence with naticids: phenotypic phylogenetic study on some Antarctic littorinoideans, with description of the zerotulid new genus Pseudonatica, and its presence in Brazil (Mollusca, Caenogastropoda). Journal of the Marine Biological Association of the United Kingdom. 98(6): 1365-1381

 
Gastropod families